Douglas Stephen Rae (born 8 November 1961) is an Australian AFI award-winning composer, musician and actor.

Early life
Rae was born in Toowoomba, Queensland, the second son and third child of Lesley and Tony Rae AM. He attended Trinity Grammar School Preparatory, Strathfield, (1965–1968), Albury Grammar School (1969–1971) and Newington College (1972–1979) all schools where his father was on staff, the later two as Headmaster. He is a graduate of the Sydney Conservatorium of Music with a degree in composition.

Film & television
Composition credits include:
 Gallipoli
 Power Games
 The Turning
 My Mistress
 Howzat
 Puberty Blues
 Beaconsfield
 Paper Giants: The Birth of Cleo
 Love My Way
 Rush
 Dead Heart
 The Well
 Traps
 Secret Men's Business
 Fireflies
 Naked
 The Alice
 Mary
 Safe Harbour
 A Difficult Woman
 Outriders
 Big Sky

Theatre
Rae has composed music for theatre productions at Belvoir St Theatre and the Sydney Theatre Company. He has also worked as an actor in many productions with directors including Geoffrey Rush and Jim Sharman.

Album
His debut solo album, Feet Lift Off The Ground, blends music of different eras using Renaissance music for melodic inspiration. It also features Geoffrey Rush on several tracks reading poems that Rae has set to music.

Awards
Rae has won the Australian Film Institute (AFI), the Australian Performing Rights Association (APRA), the Film Critics Circle of Australia (FCC) and the Australian Guild of Screen Composers (AGSC) awards. He has also won a CLIO (New York) for his work in advertising. Most recently, Rae won the 2018 FIPA (Federation Internationale de production Audiovisuale) Gold prize for his music for the Television Series "Safe Harbour".

References

External links
 Personal Website

1961 births
APRA Award winners
Living people
People educated at Newington College
Australian male composers
Australian composers
Australian male stage actors
Musicians from Sydney